Toon Meerman (born 13 October 1933) is a Dutch former footballer who played as a striker. Meerman made his professional debut at Feijenoord and also played for Excelsior.

Honours

 First match: 6 June 1953 : Feijenoord - Xerxes, 2-2

See also
Football in the Netherlands
List of football clubs in the Netherlands

References

External links
 Profile

1933 births
Living people
Dutch footballers
Feyenoord players
Excelsior Rotterdam players
Association football forwards
Footballers from Rotterdam